Mohamed Ali Khojastehpour Birang (‎; 1 July 1931 – 2007) was an Iranian flyweight freestyle wrestler. He won a silver medal at the 1956 Olympics and placed fourth at the 1959 World Championships.

Khojastehpour was born in a family of eight siblings and took up wrestling aged 14. After retiring from competitions he worked as a national wrestling coach. He died from a heart-related disease.

References

External links

1931 births
2007 deaths
Olympic wrestlers of Iran
Wrestlers at the 1956 Summer Olympics
Iranian male sport wrestlers
Olympic silver medalists for Iran
Olympic medalists in wrestling
Medalists at the 1956 Summer Olympics